Sivtsevo is a rural locality (a village) in Ulyakhinskoye Rural Settlement, Gus-Khrustalny District, Vladimir Oblast, Russia. The population was 24 as of 2010.

Geography 
Sivtsevo is located on the Gus River, 38 km south of Gus-Khrustalny (the district's administrative centre) by road. Krasny Posyolok is the nearest rural locality.

References 

Rural localities in Gus-Khrustalny District